The Lonedale Operator  is a 1911 short American drama film directed by  D. W. Griffith, starring Blanche Sweet and written by Mack Sennett for the Biograph Company. The plot of the film involves a girl who takes over a telegraph station after her father takes ill.  After the payroll for the town's mine is delivered, two drifters try to steal the money.  Their robbery is foiled because the girl is able to telegraph for help and then hold the would-be robbers off until help arrives.  The Lonedale Operator includes "elements of romance, drama, suspense, Western, and even a bit of comedy near the end."

Unlike most films at the time which had a simple plot line set in one location, The Lonedale Operator "intercuts three primary spaces—the telegraph office interior, the criminals outside, and the rescue train." Although audiences in 1911 were not used to such editing, as there were more than 100 shots in the film, the use of the telegraph helped them understand the crosscutting between scenes in such a way that they could follow the plot.  The film is also significant for Griffith's use of a close-up of a wrench, which the girl had pretended was a gun. At the time of the film's release, close-ups were still uncommon. The Lonedale Operator illustrates Griffith's growing mastery of the medium.

A print of the film survives in the film archive of the Museum of Modern Art in New York City.

Cast
 Verner Clarges as In Payroll Office
 Guy Hedlund as On Train
 Jeanie MacPherson as In Payroll Office
 W. C. Robinson as In Payroll Office
 Edward Dillon as Telegrapher (uncredited)
 Francis J. Grandon as The Engineer (uncredited)
 Joseph Graybill as A Tramp (uncredited)
 Dell Henderson as A Tramp (uncredited)
 Wilfred Lucas as The Fireman (uncredited)
 W. Chrystie Miller as In Station Lobby (uncredited)
 George Nichols as The Lonedale Operator (uncredited)
 Blanche Sweet as Daughter of the Lonedale Operator (uncredited)
 Charles West as Company Agent (uncredited)

See also
 D. W. Griffith filmography
 Blanche Sweet filmography
Treasures from American Film Archives

References

External links

1911 films
1911 drama films
1911 short films
Silent American drama films
American silent short films
American black-and-white films
Biograph Company films
Films directed by D. W. Griffith
Articles containing video clips
1910s English-language films
1910s American films
American drama short films